The Thomas-Morse MB-1 was an open-cockpit monoplane fighter manufactured by Thomas-Morse Aircraft for the U.S. Army Air Service in 1918.

Development
The MB-1 was designed by B. Douglas Thomas as a high wing parasol monoplane. Powered by a Liberty 12 engine, the MB-1 flew only once, and the weight of the Liberty 12 proved so heavy for the aircraft that the landing gear collapsed while the MB-1 was taxiing for another flight.

Specifications

References

Notes

Bibliography
 

1910s United States fighter aircraft
MB-1
Aircraft first flown in 1918